Ixform (pronounced as "X Form", stylized in all caps) was a Chinese project boy group formed through the 2021 Chinese survival show Youth With You 3 on iQIYI. The group consists of 9 members: Luo Yizhou, Tang Jiuzhou, Lian Huaiwei, Liu Guanyou, Deng Xiaoci, Sun Yinghao, Jun Liu, Duan Xingxing and Sun Yihang. 

The group was formed and officially debuted on July 29th, 2021, and disbanded on November 8th, 2022.

Members 
 Luo Yizhou (罗一舟)
 Tang Jiuzhou (唐九洲)
 Lian Huaiwei (连淮伟)
 Liu Guanyou (劉冠佑
 Deng Xiaoci (鄧孝慈)
 Sun Yinghao (孙滢皓)
 Liu Jun (刘隽)
 Duan Xingxing (段星星)
 Sun Yihang (孙亦航)

Career

Formation
IXFORM was formed through Youth With You Season 3 aired from February 18 to May 1, 2021. The show's finale was initially set on May 8, where the debut team will be formed. However, the finale is cancelled beforehand after an order from Chinese media government bureau, as the show was embroiled in the milk-wasting controversy. The group with the top 9 lineup was alleged to have been formed, but iQIYI denied the allegations in May 2021.

On July 25, 2021, the group with the same top 9 lineup make their first group appearance on Chengdu Music Festival and announced that they have officially debuted. The group is expected to promote for around 1 year and a half, and the management rights are handled by Idol Youth Entertainment of iQIYI.

Discography

Filmography

Reality Shows

References

External links 

 

Chinese boy bands
Youth With You contestants
Mandopop musical groups
Chinese pop music groups
Chinese dance music groups
Mandarin-language singers
Musical groups established in 2021
2021 establishments in China